Beachmere is a coastal rural town and locality in the Moreton Bay Region, Queensland, Australia.

It is located north of Brisbane, the state capital of Queensland.

History

The origin of the suburb name is from an early residence owned by Thomas Edwin Bonney by the name of Beachmere meaning a beach upon marshy ground. Bonney is believed to be the first European Australian settler in the area, having arrived in 1870.

Beachmere State School opened on 28 January 1986.

The Moreton Bay Birali Steiner School opened on 15 April 2013, and is part of Steiner Education Australia.

The median age of the Beachmere population was 50 years, compared to the national median age of 38.  76.8% of people living in Beachmere were born in Australia. The other top responses for country of birth were England 6.6%, New Zealand 3.9%, Philippines 0.7%, Germany 0.6%.  91.9% of people spoke only English at home; the next most common languages were 0.3% Italian, 0.2% German, 0.2% Spanish.

Education 

Beachmere State School is a government primary (Prep-6) school for boys and girls at James Road. In 2017, the school had an enrolment of 306 students with  27 teachers (20 full-time equivalent) and 20 non-teaching staff (13 full-time equivalent). It includes a special education program.

Birali Steiner School is an private primary (Prep-7) school for boys and girls at Newman Road Beachmere(). In 2017, the school had an enrolment of 32 students with  4 teachers and 5 non-teaching staff (2 full-time equivalent).

There is no secondary school in Beachmere with the nearest being in neighbouring Caboolture and Morayfield or in Bongaree on Bribie Island.

Amenities 
The Moreton Bay Regional Council operates a mobile library service which visits Clayton Park on the corner of Biggs Avenue and Main Street.

Beachmere Uniting Church is on the corner of Moreton Terrace and Second Avenue.

References

External links

 
 Town map of Beachmere, 1981

Suburbs of Moreton Bay Region
Towns in Queensland
Localities in Queensland